The 2004 West Virginia Mountaineers football team completed the regular season with an 8–4 (4–2 conference record) and traveled to the Gator Bowl, where they lost to the Florida State Seminoles 30–18. The Mountaineers began the season ranked #10, but ended disappointedly by losing the last three games of the season after starting 8–1.

Schedule

Roster
The 2004 football team featured stars Rasheed Marshall at quarterback, Kay-Jay Harris at running back, Chris Henry at receiver, and a stout defense featuring Pacman Jones (who also played returner), Mike Lorello, Kevin "Boo" McLee, Jahmile Addae, Eric Wicks, and Alton McCann. Brandon Myles also played receiver behind Henry to help out the passing game.

References

West Virginia
West Virginia Mountaineers football seasons
Big East Conference football champion seasons
West Virginia Mountaineers football